Stendal is a town in Saxony-Anhalt, Germany.

Stendal may also refer to:

 Stendal, Indiana, a town in the U.S.
 Stendal (district), a district in Saxony-Anhalt, Germany, containing the town
 Kurt Stendal (1951–2019), a Danish footballer 
 Ian Stendal (1913–1992), photographer
 Trude Stendal (born 1963), Norwegian footballer

See also
 Stendhal, a 19th-century French writer